Orphean warbler is the name of:

Eastern Orphean warbler Sylvia crassirostris
Western Orphean warbler Sylvia hortensis

Birds by common name